Vinaver is a surname. Notable people with the surname include:

Eugène Vinaver (1899–1979), Russian-born French scholar and British academic
Maxim Vinaver (1863–1926), Russian lawyer, politician and patron
Michel Vinaver (1927–2022), French dramatist and writer
Stanislav Vinaver (1891–1955), Serbian writer, poet, translator, and journalist

See also
 Winawer